Karl Emanuel Klitzsch, or often just Emanuel Klitzsch, (Schönheide, 30 October 1812 - Zwickau, 5 March 1889) was a German composer, organist and music critic. He was a friend of Robert Schumann and promoted his works. He was for many years director of music in Zwickau, teacher at the Zwickau Gymnasium and writer for the Neue Zeitschrift für Musik. As composer he used the name Emanuel Kronach.

External links

References

1812 births
1889 deaths
19th-century German composers